The 2nd Messina Grand Prix was a motor race, run to Formula Junior rules, held on 31 July 1960 at Ganzirri Lake circuit in Messina, Italy. The race was part of the Italian Formula Junior Championship.

Final standings

References

External links
 MESSINA 1960 G.P. automobilismo sul circuito di Ganzirri 

Messina Grand Prix